Rolf Stoltenberg (born 8 January 1922) is a German former field hockey player who competed in the 1952 Summer Olympics.

References

External links
 

1922 births
Possibly living people
German male field hockey players
Olympic field hockey players of Germany
Field hockey players at the 1952 Summer Olympics